"Waterfront Dance Club" / "Beneath The Burning Tree" is the first single from Funeral for a Friend's 2008 album Memory and Humanity. It was released on 4 July 2008 as both a special edition double A-side 7" along with the track "Beneath the Burning Tree", and a free download from the band's website. Prior to this, the song made its debut on BBC Radio 1's Rock Show on 3 June 2008. It also marked Funeral for a Friend's first release on their own record label, Join Us.

Music video

On 11 May 2008, it was announced via a MySpace bulletin that the band would be shooting a video for "Waterfront Dance Club" on 17 May. It was subsequently released on MySpace on 7 June 2008.

References

External links
 Waterfront Dance Club music video

Funeral for a Friend songs
2008 singles
2008 songs